The Oklahoma Turnpike Authority (formerly Oklahoma Transportation Authority) is an agency of Oklahoma that deals with issues regarding the Oklahoma turnpike system. Along with the Oklahoma Department of Transportation, the Authority is the primary infrastructure construction and maintenance agency of the State.

Leadership
The Turnpike Authority is under the supervision of the Secretary of Transportation. Under Governor of Oklahoma Kevin Stitt, Tim Gatz a Professional Landscape Architect with Bachelor's Degree in Landscape Architecture is serving as the Cabinet Secretary. Secretary Gatz also serves as the Director of the Authority and the Oklahoma Department of Transportation.The Oklahoma Turnpike Authority (OTA) is an instrumentality of the State of Oklahoma (the State) and a body corporate and politic created by statute in 1947. The Authority is authorized to construct, maintain, repair and operate turnpike projects at locations authorized by the Legislature of the State of Oklahoma and approved by the State Department of Transportation. The Authority receives revenues from turnpike tolls and a percentage of the turnpike concession sales. The Authority may issue Turnpike Revenue Bonds for the purpose of paying the costs of turnpike projects and Turnpike Revenue Refunding Bonds for the purpose of refunding any bonds of the Authority then outstanding. Turnpike Revenue Bonds are payable solely from the tolls and other revenues of the Authority and do not constitute indebtedness of the State.

The Oklahoma Turnpike Authority is similar to a public utility, providing a needed, basic service at a fee that yields a return to its investors. The Authority must generate sufficient revenues to operate and maintain its roads at a high quality while covering the interest and principal payments owed to bondholders (investors) who have purchased its revenue bonds.

The Authority consists of the Governor (ex-officio) and six members serving without pay for eight-year terms from districts established in the State Statute. The Governor may remove any member of the Authority, at any time, with or without cause. The members are appointed to represent defined geographical districts. Authority members have full control over all turnpike operations; however, the OTA must operate in strict compliance with trust agreements that define operating procedures to be followed. The Authority employs an Executive Director to manage the day-to-day operations. The Executive Director is appointed by the Authority’s Board.

Oklahoma was the first state west of Pennsylvania to complete a toll road financed exclusively from revenue bonds. The Oklahoma Turnpike Enabling Act, as amended to date, controls the designation, financing, construction, and operation of the Oklahoma Turnpikes. An excerpt from Section 1705 of the Enabling Act delegates responsibility to the Oklahoma Turnpike Authority as follows:

"To construct, maintain, repair, and operate Turnpike projects and highways, with their access and connecting roads at such locations and on such routes as it shall determine to be feasible and economically sound."

In addition to providing this responsibility to the Oklahoma Turnpike Authority, limitations were placed on the selection of toll road locations. It is the sole discretion of the Oklahoma Legislature to authorize projects considered for construction by the Oklahoma Turnpike Authority. Originally, fourteen toll road projects were approved. Today, there are 32 toll road projects authorized by Title 69, Section 1705.

The Board of Directors of the Turnpike Authority is responsible for governing the Authority. The Board is composed of the seven members, six of which are appointed by the Governor of Oklahoma, with the approval of the Oklahoma Senate, with the Governor serving ex officio as the seventh member. The Board is responsible for appointing the Director of the Authority, who serves as the Board's pleasure.

Organization

Structure
Cabinet Secretary
Board of Directors
Executive Director
Assistant Executive Director
Administrative Services Division - responsible for providing direction and general services to entire Authority
Highway Patrol - Oklahoma Highway Patrol troopers on assignment from Oklahoma Department of Public Safety, responsible for providing law enforcement services on turnpike system
Information Technology Division - responsible for overseeing all information technology used by Authority
Toll Operations Division - responsible for the collection of tolls from turnpike users
Engineering Division - responsible for providing engineering for projects of the Authority
Construction Division - responsible for providing construction projects of the Authority
Comptroller Division - responsible for auditing operations of Authority
Maintenance Division - responsible for maintenance and repair on turnpike system
PIKEPASS Division - responsible for operating the PIKEPASS automated toll collection system
Finance and Revenue Division - responsible for overseeing all Authority finances and budget

Personnel
The Turnpike Authority, as of February 2019, has 632 full-time employees.

Budget
The budget of the Turnpike Authority is derived almost exclusively from the tolls collected from the users of the turnpike system. For Calendar Year 2019, revenues are anticipated to be $330.1 million. The Authority uses those funds as follows:

See also
Turnpikes of Oklahoma

References

 About the Oklahoma Turnpike Authority, Oklahoma State Transport Authority online. Retrieved January 14, 2005.

External links
 Oklahoma Turnpike Authority

Toll roads in Oklahoma
Toll road authorities of the United States
1947 establishments in Oklahoma
Organizations based in Oklahoma City